The 2011 Connecticut Huskies football team represented the University of Connecticut in the 2011 NCAA Division I FBS football season as a member of the Big East Conference. The team was coached by Paul Pasqualoni and played its home games at Rentschler Field in East Hartford, Connecticut. It was Pasqualoni's first year with the team.

Previous season
The Huskies finished 8–5, 5–2 in Big East play to share the conference title with Pittsburgh and West Virginia. Due to victories over both schools, the Huskies earned the Big East's automatic bid to a BCS game, the first in school history, and were invited to the Fiesta Bowl where they were defeated by Big 12 champion Oklahoma 20–48.

Before the season

Coaching changes
The day after the Fiesta Bowl Head Coach Randy Edsall left the University to accept the same position at Maryland. Paul Pasqualoni was hired to replace Edsall. George DeLeone was brought in as the new offensive coordinator, with former offensive coordinator and quarterbacks coach Joe Moorhead being demoted to quarterbacks coach. Don Brown was brought in to replace Todd Orlando at defensive coordinator. Orlando left to take the same position at Florida International.

Roster changes
The Huskies lost six starters from the 2010 team to graduation. In addition to the graduation losses All-American RB Jordan Todman entered the NFL Draft a year early.

Recruiting
On February 2, 2011, Paul Pasqualoni announced that 16 student-athletes had signed a National Letter of Intent to attend Connecticut. Four; Kenton Adeyemi, Dalton Gifford, Michael Nebrich and Sean McQuillan; entered school in January to participate in spring practice.

Awards watchlists

Schedule

Game summaries

Fordham

Recap:
This game was originally scheduled to be played on September 1 at 7:30 pm. However, due to Rentschler Field being used for relief efforts for Hurricane Irene, the game was moved to Saturday. The team discussed playing the game at the Yale Bowl in New Haven if the field did not become available in time, but on Wednesday, August 31, the team announced the game would be played in East Hartford on Saturday at noon.

Vanderbilt

 
Recap:

Iowa State

Recap:

Buffalo

Recap:

Western Michigan

Recap:

West Virginia

Recap:

South Florida

Recap:

Pittsburgh

Recap:

Syracuse

Recap:

Louisville

Recap:

Rutgers

Recap:

Cincinnati

Recap:

References

Connecticut
UConn Huskies football seasons
Connecticut Huskies football